Denis César de Matos (14 April 1987), known as just Denis, is a Brazilian professional footballer who plays as a goalkeeper.

Career 
Denis was born in Jaú, São Paulo. A Ponte Preta youth graduate, he was promoted to the main squad in 2006, but was third-choice (behind Jean and Aranha). He made his first team debut on 24 February 2007, starting in a 1–2 away loss against Grêmio Barueri for the Campeonato Paulista championship.

Denis appeared regularly during that year's Série B, mainly profiting from Aranha's injury. He would spend the rest of his spell as a backup, however.

Denis moved to São Paulo on 22 January 2009. He made his debut for the club three days later, replacing injured Rogério Ceni in a 2–0 away win against Portuguesa. He would spend his first two years behind Ceni and Bosco.

In 2011 Denis was promoted to back up, after Bosco's retirement. In the following year, after profiting from Ceni's serious injury, he appeared regularly for Tricolor, but was again backup after the latter's recovery.

Aris 

On 2 July 2021, Greek Super League club Aris announced he signed a two-year contract with the club.

On 22 July 2021, Denis made his debut for Aris on a 2-0 away loss against Astana fc for the 2nd play off round of Conference League

Career statistics 

1 Includes matches and goals in Copa Libertadores, Copa Sudamericana.
2 Includes matches and goals in Campeonato Paulista.

Honours 
São Paulo
 Copa Sudamericana: 2012
 Florida Cup: 2017

Figueirense
 Campeonato Catarinense: 2018

References

External links 
 São Paulo official profile 
 

1987 births
Living people
Footballers from São Paulo (state)
Brazilian footballers
Brazilian expatriate footballers
Association football goalkeepers
Campeonato Brasileiro Série A players
Campeonato Brasileiro Série B players
Primeira Liga players
Super League Greece players
Associação Atlética Ponte Preta players
São Paulo FC players
Figueirense FC players
Sport Club do Recife players
Gil Vicente F.C. players
Aris Thessaloniki F.C. players
Brazilian expatriate sportspeople in Portugal
Expatriate footballers in Portugal
Brazilian expatriate sportspeople in Greece
Expatriate footballers in Greece
People from Jaú